Langenbernsdorf is a village in the district of Zwickau in the  Free State of Saxony.

Geography
To the north of Langenbernsdorf is a wood called the Werdauer Wald.

Neighboring municipalities
Adjacent municipalities in the district of Zwickau include:
Zwickau
Neukirchen
Werdau
Crimmitschau
Seelingstädt
Teichwolframsdorf in Thuringia is also adjacent to Langenbernsdorf.

Municipality subdivisions
The municipality includes the following subdivisions:
Langenbernsdorf
Niederalbertsdorf
Stöcken
Trünzig

History
Langenbernsdorf was founded in 1257 and was named "Bernztorff".

References

The information in this article is based on and/or translated from its German equivalent.

External links
www.langenbernbernsdorf.de

Zwickau (district)